Short Fast Loud (stylised as 'short.fast.loud.') is a radio show on Triple J in Australia. It is hosted by Joshua "Redbeard" Merriel and features punk, hardcore, emo and similar music. The name for the show was taken from the Kid Dynamite album: Shorter, Faster, Louder (Jade Tree, 2000). The show runs on a Wednesday night from 9pm to 11pm. The show originally started broadcast in January 2004 as a 2-hour format by the show's original host, Stu Harvey, but was extended to a 3-hour version in 2006. It returned to a 2 hour length show in 2022. Stu Harvey stepped aside as host of short.fast.loud at the end of 2014 to focus on other life projects and Josh Merriel has hosted the show since 2015.

Major features of the show are interviews with bands both in the studio and via phonelink, scene reports from listeners around Australia as well as a segment called "Old School Pride" (Named after the H.F.L. song of the same title), where four 'old school' songs are played that are requested by a listener. Another weekly segment is "The New Noise", in which two songs are chosen by Josh from JJJ Unearthed in order to provide more exposure to new Australian music. Touring bands also occasionally play live acoustic sets in the studio.

In the middle of every year listeners are invited to submit their top releases of the year so far for a mid-year countdown special. At the end of each year listeners are invited to submit a ranked list of their ten favourite releases of the year for an end-of-year countdown special.

The show makes a point of supporting local and emerging artists. A large proportion of the music played is Australian and there are some all-Australian music nights. Tracks from demos sent to the show are also often played.

Top 40 2005
 40 The Open Season - Chase EP **
 39 Yidcore - Eighth Day Slice / Fiddlin On Ya Roof **
 38 Taking Sides - Dresscode **
 37 Bad Day Down - Biting The Hand That Feeds **
 36 Dropkick Murphys - The Warriors Code
 35 Panic! at the Disco - A Fever You Can't Sweat Out
 34 Death by Stereo - Death for Life
 33 After the Fall - Always Forever Now **
 32 Silverstein - Discovering the Waterfront
 31 Latterman - No Matter Where We Go..!
 30 Every Time I Die - Gutter Phenomenon
 29 Lagwagon - Resolve
 28 Pennywise - The Fuse
 27 Millencolin - Kingwood
 26 Coheed and Cambria - Good Apollo I'm Burning Star IV, Volume One: From Fear Through the Eyes of Madness
 25 Story of the Year - In The Wake Of Determination
 24 Funeral for a Friend - Hours
 23 Away From Now - Blackout **
 22 Thrice - Vheisu
 21 Kisschasy - United Paper People **
 20 Behind Crimson Eyes - Pavour Nocturnus **
 19 Behind Crimson Eyes - Prologue: The Art of War/Cherry Blossom Epitaph **
 18 The Dead Walk! - ReAnimation **
 17 Motion City Soundtrack - Commit This To Memory
 16 Anberlin - Never Take Friendship Personal
 15 Alkaline Trio - Crimson
 14 Fall Out Boy - From Under The Cork Tree
 13 Gyroscope - Are You Involved? **
 12 Bodyjar - Bodyjar **
 11 Irrelevant - Ascension **
 10 Comeback Kid - Wake the Dead
 9 Miles Away - Consequences **
 8 The Disables - Nuthin for No One **
 7 Grand Fatal - Allies **
 6 A Wilhelm Scream - Ruiner
 5 The Hot Lies - Heart Attacks and Callous Acts **
 4 Horsell Common - Lost A Lot of Blood **
 3 Against Me! - Searching For A Former Clarity
 2 Parkway Drive - Killing With a Smile **
 1 Propagandhi - Potemkin City Limits

Top 40 2006
 40 Billy Talent - Billy Talent II
 39 Extortion - Degenerate **
 38 Escape the Fate - Dying Is Your Latest Fashion
 37 50 Lions - Nowhere to Run**
 36 God So Loved the World - God So Loved the World**
 35 Against Me! - Americans Abroad!!! Against Me!!! Live in London!!!
 34 +44 - When Your Heart Stops Beating
 33 From First to Last - Heroine
 32 Betrayed - Substance
 31 Jaws - Slow Motion Suicide **
 30 Bigwig - Reclamation
 29 Break Even - Young at Heart **
 28 My Chemical Romance - The Black Parade
 27 The Bouncing Souls - The Gold Record
 26 Just Say Go!! - Revive **
 25 Saosin - Saosin
 24  The Dead Walk! - We Prowl The Streets **
 23 The Getaway Plan - Hold Conversation **
 22 Atreyu - A Death Grip On Yesterday
 21 Unpaid Debt - Southern Cross Bones **
 20 Bad Day Down - If This Is How Is Had To Be **
 19 I Killed the Prom Queen - Music for the Recently Deceased **
 18 Thursday - A City by the Light Divided
 17 Carpathian - Nothing to Lose **
 16 The Matches - Decomposer
 15 Strike Anywhere - Dead FM
 14 The Draft - In a Million Pieces
 13 The Bronx - The Bronx (II)
 12 Taking Back Sunday - Louder Now
 11 The Lawrence Arms - Oh! Calcutta!
 10 Brand New - The Devil and God Are Raging Inside Me
 9 Behind Crimson Eyes - A Revelation For Despair **
 8 Horsell Common - Satellite Wonderland **
 7 Anti-Flag - For Blood and Empire
 6 NOFX - Wolves in Wolves' Clothing
 5 Frenzal Rhomb - Forever Malcolm Young **
 4 Alexisonfire - Crisis
 3 Underoath - Define the Great Line
 2 AFI - Decemberunderground
 1 Rise Against - The Sufferer & the Witness
** Denotes Australian Artist

Top 40 2007
 40 The Nation Blue - Protest Songs **
 39 Cut Sick - End It All **
 38 Anti-Flag - A Benefit for Victims of Violent Crime
 37 Chuck Ragan - Feast or Famine
 36 Darkest Hour - Deliver Us
 35 Mary Jane Kelly - Marionettes **
 34 The Weakerthans - Reunion Tour
 33 Samsara - The Emptiness **
 32 Every Time I Die - The Big Dirty
 31 Yidcore - They Tried To Kill Us. They Failed. Lets Eat**
 30 50 Lions - Time Is the Enemy **
 29 Extortion - Control**
 28 Modern Life Is War - Midnight in America
 27 Deez Nuts - Rep Your Hood **
 26 Daggermouth - Turf Wars
 25 Anberlin - Cities
 24 Lungs - An Anatomical Guide **
 23 The Gaslight Anthem - Sink or Swim
 22 No Apologies - Survival **
 21 Smoke or Fire - This Sinking Ship
 20 Circa Survive - On Letting Go
 19 Rex Banner - The Good Times Are Killing Me **
 18 Crime in Stereo - Crime in Stereo is Dead
 17 Dropkick Murphys - The Meanest of Times
 16 Motion City Soundtrack - Even If It Kills Me
 15 Thrice - The Alchemy Index Vols. I & II
 14 Evergreen Terrace - Wolfbiker
 13 The Amity Affliction - High Hopes **
 12 Jungle Fever - Stayin' Alive**
 11 Gallows - Orchestra of Wolves
 10 Lifetime - Lifetime
 9 Comeback Kid - Broadcasting...
 8 Horsell Common - The Rescue **
 7 Strung Out - Blackhawks Over Los Angeles
 6 Miles Away - Rewind, Repeat **
 5 Mindsnare - Disturb the Hive **
 4 Bad Religion - New Maps of Hell
 3 Against Me! - New Wave
 2 A Wilhelm Scream - Career Suicide
 1 Parkway Drive - Horizons **

** Denotes Australian Artist

Top 40 2008

40. Antagonist A.D. - We Are The Dead 
39. Dropsaw - Victims Or Killers **
38. Ill Brigade - The EP **
37. A Secret Death - Secret Death **
36. Millencolin - Machine 15
35. Bayside - Shudder
34. Paint It Black - New Lexicon
33. Dillinger Four - Civilwar
32. Fucked Up - Chemistry of Common Life
31. The Broderick - Illusion Over Despair **
30. Bleeding Through - Declaration
29. Break Even / Something More Split **
28. Her Nightmare - Come Anarchy Come Ruin **
27. Rex Banner / Homewrecker Split **
26. Pennywise - Reason to Believe
25. Escape The Fate - This War Is Ours
24. The Bronx - III
23. Ceremony - Still Nothing Moves You
22. New Found Glory - Tip of the Iceberg
21. Robotosaurus - Manhater **
20. Irrelevant - New Guilt **
19. Polar Bear Club - Sometimes Things Just Disappear
18. Cancer Bats - Hail Destroyer
17. Verse - Aggression
16. House Vs. Hurricane - Forfeiture **
15.Alkaline Trio - Agony & Irony
14. Extortion - Sick**
13. Mary Jane Kelly - Our Streets Turn White**
12. Misery Signals - Controller
11. Confession - Cant Live Cant Breath**
10. H2O - Nothing To Prove
9. Underoath - Lost in the Sound of Separation
8. Deez Nuts - Stay True **
7. City And Colour - Bring Me Your Love
6. Have Heart - Songs To Scream At The Sun
5. Bring Me the Horizon - Suicide Season
4. The Gaslight Anthem - The '59 Sound
3. Rise Against - Appeal To Reason
2. The Amity Affliction - Severed Ties **
1. Carpathian - Isolation **

** Denotes Australian Artist

Top 40 2009

40. Pour Habit - Suiticide 
39. Title Fight - The Last Thing That You Forget 
38. I Exist - Three Nails and a Book of Flaws **
37. In Trenches - Relieve and Regret **
36. Frank Turner - Poetry of the Deed
35. Say Anything - Say Anything
34. Four Year Strong - Explains It All
33. Strung Out - Agents of the Underground
32. August Burns Red - Constellations
31. All Time Low - Nothing Personal 
30. 50 Lions - Where Life Expires **
29. A Wilhelm Scream - A Wilhelm Scream 
28. Fireworks - All I Have to Offer Is My Own Confusion 
27. Trapped Under Ice - Secrets Of The World 
26. Architects - Hollow Crown
25. Taking Back Sunday - New Again
24. Raised Fist - Veil Of Ignorance
23. Evergreen Terrace - Almost Home
22. Thrice - Beggars
21. Rancid - Let The Dominoes Fall 
20. Hopeless - Dear World **
19. AFI - Crash Love 
18. The Devil Wears Prada - With Roots Above and Branches Below 
17. Silverstein - A Shipwreck in the Sand 
16. Strike Anywhere - Iron Front 
15. Brand New - Daisy 
14. Converge - Axe to Fall 
13. Thursday - Common Existence 
12. A Death In The Family - Small Town Stories **
11. New Found Glory - Not Without A Fight 
10. Confession - Cancer **
9. NOFX - Coaster
8. Gallows - Grey Britain 
7. Set Your Goals - This Will Be the Death of Us
6. Polar Bear Club - Chasing Hamburg
5. Every Time I Die - New Junk Aesthetic
4. Alexisonfire - Old Crows/Young Cardinals
3. Propagandhi - Supporting Caste
2. Break Even - The Bright Side **
1. A Day To Remember - Homesick

** Denotes Australian artist

Top 40 2010
40. Buried in Verona - Saturday Night Sever ** 
39. Attack Attack! - Attack Attack! 
38. Against Me! - White Crosses 
37. Phantoms - As Above, So Below ** 
36. Motion City Soundtrack - My Dinosaur Life 
35. Anchors - Bad Juju ** 
34. Ceremony - Rohnert Park 
33. You Me at Six - Hold Me Down 
32. Skyway! - Nauseating Suburbia ** 
31. Mary Jane Kelly - Like There's No Tomorrow ** 
30. Hopeless - Human ** 
29. Emarosa - Emarosa 
28. Dillinger Escape Plan - Option Paralysis 
27. Trash Talk - Eyes & Nines 
26. Rolo Tomassi - Cosmology 
25. Hand of Mercy - The Fallout ** 
24. The Flatliners - Cavalcade 
23. Cancer Bats - Bears, Mayors, Scraps & Bones 
22. Underoath - Ø (Disambiguation) 
21. Alkaline Trio - This Addiction 
20. Deez Nuts - This One's For You ** 
19. Pierce the Veil - Selfish Machines 
18. Kvelertak - Kvelertak 
17. Bad Religion - The Dissent of Man 
16. Stick to Your Guns - The Hope Division 
15. Dream On, Dreamer - Hope ** 
14. The Devil Wears Prada - Zombie 
13. I Exist - I: A Turn for the Worse ** 
12. Comeback Kid - Symptoms and Cures 
11. Alexisonfire - Dog's Blood 
10. The Wonder Years - The Upsides 
9. House Vs. Hurricane - Perspectives ** 
8. The Gaslight Anthem - American Slang 
7. The Ghost Inside - Returners 
6. Bring Me the Horizon - There Is a Hell Believe Me I've Seen It. There Is a Heaven Let's Keep It a Secret. 
5. Four Year Strong - Enemy of the World 
4. Miles Away - Endless Roads ** 
3. A Day to Remember - What Separates Me from You 
2. Parkway Drive - Deep Blue ** 
1. The Amity Affliction - Youngbloods **

** Denotes Australian Artist

Top 40 2011
40. Falling in Reverse - The Drug in Me is You 
39. Trapped Under Ice - Big Kiss Goodnight 
38. Of Mice & Men - The Flood 
37. Dropkick Murphys - Going Out In Style 
36. We Are The Ocean - Go Now And Live 
35. Silverstein - Rescue 
34. Tonight Alive - What Are You Scared Of? ** 
33. Four Year Strong - In Some Way, Shape Or Form 
32. Yellowcard - When You're Through Thinking, Say Yes 
31. The Swellers - Good For Me 
30. August Burns Red - Leveler 
29. Heroes For Hire - Take One For The Team ** 
28. The Story So Far - Under Soil And Dirt 
27. Man Overboard - Man Overboard 
26. I Exist - II:The Broken Passage ** 
25. Architects - The Here And Now 
24. You Me At Six - Sinners Never Sleep 
23. Set Your Goals - Burning At Both Ends 
22. Transit - Listen & Forgive 
21. The Bride - President Rd. ** 
20. Fucked Up - David Comes to Life 
19. Dream On, Dreamer - Heartbound ** 
18. Skyway - Finders Keepers ** 
17. Rise Against - End Game 
16. Frank Turner - England Keep My Bones 
15. Northlane - Discoveries ** 
14. The Devil Wears Prada - Dead Throne 
13. Confession - The Long Way Home ** 
12. The Smith Street Band - No One Gets Lost Anymore ** 
11. Fireworks - Gospel 
10. Blink-182 - Neighborhoods 
9. New Found Glory - Radiosurgery 
8. Polar Bear Club - Clash Battle Guilt Pride 
7. The Wonder Years - Suburbia I've Given You All and Now I'm Nothing  
6. Frenzal Rhomb - Smoko At The Pet Food Factory ** 
5. Defeater - Empty Days And Sleepless Nights 
4. Balance and Composure - Separation  
3. Touché Amoré - Parting The Sea Between Brightness And Me 
2. Title Fight - Shed 
1. La Dispute - Wildlife

** Denotes Australian Artist

Top 40 2012
40. Stick To Your Guns - Diamond 
39. Memphis May Fire - Challenger 
38. Milhouse -Everything's Coming Up ** 
37. Basement – Colourmeinkindness 
36. Matty Effin Morison – Hit The Bigtime ** 
35. Jamie Hay – King Of The Sun ** 
34. Hoodlum Shouts – Young Man, Old Man ** 
33. For All Eternity – Beyond The Gates ** 
32. Clowns - Eat A Gun ** 
31. While She Sleeps – This Is The Six 
30. Anchors – Lost At The Bottom Of The World ** 
29. OFF! – OFF! 
28. Hand Of Mercy – Last Lights **
27. Hot Water Music – Exister 
26. Make Do And Mend – Everything You Ever Loved 
25. Hands Like Houses – Ground Dweller ** 
24. Luca Brasi – Tassie ** 
23. Japandroids – Celebration Rock
22. Cancer Bats – Dead Set On Living
21. The Menzingers – On The Impossible Past 
20. Gallows – Gallows 
19. Billy Talent – Dead Silence 
18. Local Resident Failure – A Breath Of Stale Air **
17. Every Time I Die – Ex Lives 
16. Pierce The Veil – Collide With The Sky 
15. Propagandhi – Failed States 
14. Converge – All We Love We Leave Behind 
13. NOFX – Self Entitled 
12. Title Fight – Floral Green 
11. Buried In Verona – Notorious ** 
10. Pennywise – All Or Nothing
9. Architects – Daybreaker
8. House Vs Hurricane – Crooked Teeth ** 
7. The Gaslight Anthem – Handwritten  
6. Enter Shikari – A Flash Flood Of Colour 
5. In Hearts Wake – Divination ** 
4. The Smith Street Band – Sunshine & Technology **
3. The Ghost Inside – Get What You Give 
2. The Amity Affliction – Chasing Ghosts **
1. Parkway Drive – Atlas **

** Denotes Australian Artist

Top 40 2013
40. Title Fight - Spring Songs 
39. Safe Hands - Montenegro ** 
38. Perspectives - Blind ** 
37. Counterparts - The Difference Between Hell And Home 
36. Young Lions - Burn ** 
35. Citizen - Youth 
34. Daylight - Jar 
33. August Burns Red - Rescue & Restore 
32. Endless Heights - New Bloom ** 
31. A.F.I. - Burials 
30. Trophy Eyes - Everything Goes Away ** 
29. Foxtrot - Gone Fishin ** 
28. Deez Nuts - Bout It ** 
27. Bad Religion - True North 
26. Frank Turner - Tape Deck Heart 
25. FIDLAR - Fidlar 
24. Paper Arms - The Smoke Will Clear ** 
23. Zebrahead - Call Your Friends 
22. Saviour - First Light To My Deathbed ** 
21. Dillinger Escape Plan - One Of Us Is The Killer 
20. Hands Like Houses - Unimagine ** 
19. In Hearts Wake - Skydancer ** 
18. Hellions - Die Young ** 
17. The Wonder Years - Greatest Generation 
16. The Bronx - The Bronx IV 
15. Defeater - Letters Home 
14. Touché Amoré - Is Survived By 
13. The Story So Far - What You Don't See 
12. Dream On, Dreamer - Loveless ** 
11. Wil Wagner - Laika ** 
10. Balance and Composure - The Things We Think We're Missing 
9. Bodyjar - Role Model ** 
8. Violent Soho - Hungry Ghost ** 
7. letlive - The Blackest Beautiful 
6. The Bennies - Rainbows In Space ** 
5. Clowns - I'm Not Right ** 
4. A Day To Remember - Common Courtesy 
3. The Smith Street Band - Don't Fuck With Our Dreams ** 
2. Bring Me the Horizon - Sempiternal 
1. Northlane - Singularity **

** Denotes Australian Artist

Top 30 2014
30. Postblue - I Hope They're Praying For Me ** 
29. New Found Glory - Resurrection 
28. Real Friends - Maybe This Place Is The Same and We're Just Changing
27. Comeback Kid - Die Knowing 
26. The Decline - Can I Borrow a Feeling? ** 
25. Issues - Issues 
24. The Gaslight Anthem - Get Hurt 
23. Neck Deep - Wishful Thinking 
22. Joyce Manor - Never Hungover Again 
21. Hand of Mercy - Resolve ** 
20. Confession - Life and Death ** 
19. The Menzingers - Rented World 
18. Being as an Ocean - How We Both Wondrously Peris 
17. Every Time I Die - From Parts Unknown 
16. Beartooth - Disgusting 
15.Of Mice and Men - Restoring Force 
14. Modern Baseball - Your Gonna Miss It All 
13. Against Me! - Transgender Dysphoria Blues 
12. Ceres - I Don't Want To Be Anywhere But Here ** 
11. Rise Against - The Black Market 
10. The Bennies - Heavy Disco ** 
9. La Dispute - Rooms of the House 
8. I Killed The Prom Queen - Beloved ** 
7. Trophy Eyes - Mend, Move On **  
6. Luca Brasi - By A Thread ** 
5. The Ghost Inside - Dear Youth 
4. The Smith Street Band - Throw Me In The River **  
3. Architects - Lost Together//Lost Forever 
2. The Amity Affliction - Let The Ocean Take Me ** 
1. In Hearts Wake - Earthwalker **

** Denotes Australian Artist

External links 
short.fast.loud at Triple J

Triple J programs